Pallenis is a small genus of flowering plants in the tribe Inuleae within the family Asteraceae.  The name is derived from palea (chaff), referring to the chaffy receptacle.

This is primarily a Mediterranean genus, occurring in desert and coastal habitats of Southern Europe, North Africa, the Canary Islands and the Middle East. The range of one species extends eastward into Central Asia.

The genus consists of annual or biennial herbaceous plants with white, sub-silky hairs on the soft stems, growing to a height of 20–50 cm. They grow on uncultivated or disturbed land and roadsides. They are hardy, surviving in dry to very dry environments or cold spells.

The small, alternate, entire leaves are elliptic to obovate. They have short petioles at the base of the stem but are sessile in the upper half.

The solitary inflorescence grows at the top of the branches. The large, slightly convex receptacle shows numerous, yellowish orange, hermaphrodite disc florets and two whorls of yellow ray florets. They flower from March to July.

The long, villous, involucral bracts end in an apical sharp-pointed spine. The achene is glabrous or is covered with short hairs.

The essential oil of Pallenis spinosa consists for the main part of oxygenated sesquiterpenoids.

Pallenis maritima is a protected plant in southern France.

Pallenis hierochuntica (Michon) Greuter is sold under the name rose of Jericho.  This plant also grows in the region from North-Africa to Asia.

Species

References

Bibliography

Inuleae
Asteraceae genera
Taxa named by Henri Cassini